The Birthday Cup (also referred to as the Birendra Memorial Cup in the 2002 edition) was an association football competition organised to mark the birthday of King Birendra of Nepal in 1974. After the abolition of the Nepalese monarchy, the tournament has since been axed.

Editions
Accurate as of 4 March 2016.

References

External links
Nepal football history

 

Football competitions in Nepal
1974 establishments in Nepal